The 2016 China Open Super Series Premier was the eleventh Superseries tournament of the 2016 BWF Super Series. The tournament will take place in Fuzhou, China from November 15–20, 2016 with a total prize money of $700,000. For the first time in the history of this super series tournament, none of the Chinese players won any title.

Players by nation

Men's singles

Seeds

Top half

Bottom half

Finals

Women's singles

Seeds

Top half

Bottom half

Finals

Men's doubles

Seeds

Top half

Bottom half

Finals

Women's doubles

Seeds

Top half

Bottom half

Finals

Mixed doubles

Seeds

Top half

Bottom half

Finals

References

External links
 BWF World Superseries at www.bwfworldsuperseries.com

China Open (badminton)
China
2016 in Chinese sport
Sport in Fuzhou